Stephen Douglas Kerr (born September 27, 1965) is an American professional basketball coach and former player who is the head coach of the Golden State Warriors of the National Basketball Association (NBA). He is a nine-time NBA champion, having won five titles as a player (three with the Chicago Bulls and two with the San Antonio Spurs) as well as four with the Warriors as a head coach. Kerr is the only NBA player to win four straight NBA titles after 1969. Kerr has the highest career three-point field goal percentage (45.4%) in NBA history for any player with at least 250 three-pointers made. He also held the NBA record for the highest three-point percentage in a season at 52.4% until the record was broken by Kyle Korver in 2010. He is known as one of the most accurate three-point shooters of all time, and one of the greatest coaches in NBA history.

Kerr played college basketball with the Arizona Wildcats. He was a two-time first-team all-conference player in the Pac-10 (now known as the Pac-12), and earned All-American honors as a senior in 1988. Selected by the Phoenix Suns in the second round of the 1988 NBA draft, he played 15 seasons in the NBA. Kerr became a minority owner of the Suns as part of the group led by Robert Sarver that purchased the team in 2004. In June 2007, Phoenix named Kerr the team's president of basketball operations and general manager, and he was one of majority owner Sarver's trusted basketball advisors. Kerr announced he was leaving the position in June 2010, but retained his minority share until 2014. Afterward, Kerr returned as a color commentator for NBA on TNT until 2014, when he pursued a career in coaching.

In May 2014, Kerr received his first head coaching job with the Golden State Warriors. Under his leadership, the franchise entered the most successful period in its history, reaching six NBA Finals and winning four championships in 2015, 2017, 2018, and 2022. The 2015–16 Warriors won an unprecedented 73 games, breaking the record for the most wins in an NBA season, previously held by Kerr's 1995–96 Chicago Bulls.

As member of the U.S. national team, Kerr won the 1986 FIBA World Championship as a player, and was an assistant coach on the gold medal-winning 2020 Olympic team. He was named the head coach of Team USA for 2023–24.

Early life 
Kerr was born in Beirut, Lebanon, to Malcolm H. Kerr, a Lebanese-American academic who specialized in the Middle East, and his wife, Ann (Zwicker). He has three siblings. His grandfather, Stanley Kerr, volunteered with the Near East Relief after the Armenian genocide and rescued women and orphans in Aleppo and Marash before eventually settling in Beirut. Kerr spent much of his childhood in Lebanon and other Middle Eastern countries. While in Beirut in the summer of 1983, he met a number of US Marines who were later killed in the Beirut barracks bombings. Kerr attended Cairo American College in Egypt, the American Community School in Beirut, Lebanon, and Palisades High School (now Palisades Charter High School) in Los Angeles, graduating in 1983.

Malcolm Kerr was killed by members of the Shia Lebanese militia called Islamic Jihad on the morning of January 18, 1984, at the age of 52 while he was serving as president of the American University of Beirut. He was shot twice in the back of his head, by gunmen using suppressed handguns, in the hallway outside his office. Kerr was 18 years old at the time, and a college freshman; regarding his father's death, he has said: "Before my father was killed, my life was impenetrable. Bad things happened to other people."

College career 

Minimally recruited out of high school, Kerr played basketball at the University of Arizona from 1983 to 1988. In the summer of 1986, he was named to the U.S. national team that competed in the FIBA World Championship in Spain. It was the last American men's senior squad composed strictly of amateur players to capture a gold medal. He blew out his knee in the tournament, forcing him to miss the Wildcats' entire 1986–87 season. 

During pre-game warmups at arch-rival Arizona State University in 1988, Kerr was taunted by Sun Devils fans with chants that included "PLO" and "Where’s your father?" Though tearful, Kerr led the Wildcats to victory, scoring 20 points in the first half, making all six of his three-point attempts. The Arizona State athletic director Charles Harris sent a letter of apology to him a few days later. Along with fellow All-American teammate Sean Elliott, Kerr helped the Wildcats reach the Final Four of the 1988 NCAA tournament. A two-time first-team All-Pac-10 selection, Kerr also set an NCAA single-season record for 3-point percentage (57.3%, 114–199) in 1987–88.

Kerr graduated from the University of Arizona in 1988 with a Bachelor of General Studies, with emphasis on history, sociology and English.

Professional career

Phoenix Suns (1988–1989) 
Kerr was selected by the Phoenix Suns in the second round of the 1988 NBA draft.

Cleveland Cavaliers (1989–1992) 
In 1989, Kerr was traded to the Cleveland Cavaliers for draft consideration. He spent over three seasons (1989–1992) there.

Orlando Magic (1992–1993) 
In 1992, Kerr was traded to the Orlando Magic for draft consideration.

Chicago Bulls (1993–1998) 
In 1993, Kerr signed with the Chicago Bulls. The Bulls made the playoffs in the 1993–94 and 1994–95 seasons, but without Michael Jordan's presence for all of 1994 and much of 1995, the team could not advance to the Finals. However, with Jordan back full-time for the 1995–96 season, the Bulls set a then-NBA record of 72–10 and defeated the Seattle SuperSonics in the 1996 NBA Finals in six games.

In the next season, the Bulls logged a 69–13 record for the regular season, and reached the 1997 NBA Finals, where they faced the Utah Jazz. At the end of Game 6, with the score tied at 86, Kerr took a pass from Jordan and hit the winning shot to make the Bulls lead 88–86. The Bulls defeated the Jazz in six games, with Toni Kukoč sealing the victory with a slam dunk with just 0.6 seconds left to make the score 90–86. Kerr also won the Three-Point Contest at the 1997 NBA All-Star Weekend.

In the last minute of Game 2 of the 1998 NBA Finals against Utah, Kerr missed a 3-pointer, grabbed his own rebound and made a pass to Jordan who made a crucial three-point play, putting them in the lead for good. The play helped Chicago win the game and tie the series at 1. The Bulls won the series in six games.

San Antonio Spurs (1999–2001) 
In January 1999, Kerr was acquired by the San Antonio Spurs in a sign-and-trade deal with the Bulls, whereby Chuck Person and a first-round pick in the 2000 NBA draft was sent to Chicago. The Spurs reached 1999 NBA Finals and won their first NBA Championship with a 4–1 series victory over the New York Knicks. Kerr became the second player to win four straight NBA titles without being a part of the 1960s Boston Celtics dynasty, the other being Frank Saul, who won four straight with Rochester and Minneapolis from 1951 to 1954. Kerr and Saul were the only two players in NBA history to have won two championships with two different teams in consecutive seasons, until Patrick McCaw achieved the same feat in 2019 and Danny Green in 2020.

Portland Trail Blazers (2001–2002) 
Kerr was traded to the Portland Trail Blazers alongside Derek Anderson on July 24, 2001, in a deal that brought Steve Smith to the Spurs. He would remain in Portland for the 2001–02 season, playing in 65 games.

Return to San Antonio (2002–2003) 
On August 2, 2002, Kerr was traded back to San Antonio along with Erick Barkley and a 2003 second-round pick. In return, the Trail Blazers received Charles Smith, Amal McCaskill, and Antonio Daniels. Kerr played in nearly every game (75) the following year, which was his final season in the league. In Game Six of the 2003 Western Conference Finals against the Dallas Mavericks, Kerr made four second-half three-pointers that helped eliminate Dallas. The Spurs eventually won the NBA championship by beating the New Jersey Nets in the 2003 NBA Finals, 4–2.

Retirement 
Kerr announced his retirement after the 2003 NBA Finals. During his NBA career, he played 910 regular season games. He retired as the league's all-time leader in single-season three-point shooting percentage (.524 in 1994–95) and career three-point shooting percentage (.454). Kerr won five NBA championships as a player.

Broadcaster and commentator 

In 2003, Kerr became a broadcast analyst for Turner Network Television (TNT), offering commentary alongside analyst Marv Albert. During his tenure, he performed a segment sponsored by Coors Light called Steve's Refreshing Thoughts in which he brought up interesting facts in NBA history. This segment continued through sponsorship and became known as Steve Wonders, sponsored by Sprint. In the same time period, Kerr also contributed to Yahoo! as an NBA commentator.

He has provided his voice for the in-game commentary of EA Sports video games NBA Live 06, NBA Live 07, NBA Live 08, NBA Live 09 and NBA Live 10 with Albert. He has also provided his voice as a color analyst for NBA 2K12, NBA 2K13, NBA 2K14 and NBA 2K15. He remained a commentator in NBA 2K15 despite becoming the Golden State Warriors coach for the 2014–15 season several months prior to the game's release. Kerr's commentary also appears during All-Star play in the seventh gen port of NBA 2K16.

Kerr left broadcasting in 2007 to become general manager for the Phoenix Suns, but it was confirmed on June 28, 2010, that he would return as an NBA analyst for TNT starting with the 2010–11 NBA season. Since 2011, Kerr has also called the NCAA Men's Division I Basketball Championship on Turner Sports and CBS, teaming up with lead broadcasters Jim Nantz and Clark Kellogg for the First Four and Final Four games, and with Albert in other rounds.

Kerr was a regular contributor to the website Grantland from 2011 until it closed in 2015.

Executive career

Phoenix Suns (2004–2010) 
On April 15, 2004, Kerr was announced as a member of a potential group of buyers that would acquire his old team, the Phoenix Suns, from Jerry Colangelo for $300 million. He became part of Suns management, acting as a consultant. During the 2006 NBA All-Star Weekend, he was a member of the San Antonio team that won the Shooting Stars Competition.

On June 2, 2007, Kerr announced that he would become the general manager of the Phoenix Suns beginning with the 2007–2008 season. In 2008, the Suns traded forward Shawn Marion and guard Marcus Banks to the Miami Heat in exchange for Shaquille O'Neal. The Suns were eliminated by the San Antonio Spurs in five games in the first round of the playoffs. On December 10, 2008, Kerr continued to remake the Suns roster by trading Boris Diaw, Raja Bell, and Sean Singletary to the Charlotte Bobcats in exchange for Jason Richardson, Jared Dudley, and the Bobcats' 2010 second-round draft pick, which was used to draft Gani Lawal of Georgia Tech. On June 25, 2009, Kerr traded O'Neal to the Cleveland Cavaliers for Ben Wallace, Sasha Pavlovic, a future second-round draft pick and cash.

On May 5, 2010, the Suns wore their "Noche Latina" Los Suns jerseys in Game 2 against the Spurs to be united against the controversial Arizona immigration law. Kerr himself compared the law to Nazi Germany.

On June 30, 2010, Kerr left the Phoenix Suns as president of basketball operations and general manager as his contract ran out. He continued to own less than one percent of the Suns' organization until 2014, when he decided to coach the Golden State Warriors.

Coaching career

Golden State Warriors (2014–present) 

On May 14, 2014, Kerr reached an agreement to become the head coach for the Golden State Warriors, succeeding Mark Jackson in a five year $25 million deal. Kerr coached in the 2014 Summer League for the Warriors. During the 2014–15 season, the team's offense employed elements of the triangle offense from his playing days in Chicago under Phil Jackson, the spacing and pace of Gregg Popovich in San Antonio, and the uptempo principles Mike D'Antoni and later Alvin Gentry used in Phoenix when Kerr was the GM.

After the Warriors beat the Houston Rockets to win their 14th consecutive game, Kerr became the first coach to start his career with a 19–2 record. This beat out Al Cervi and his 18–2 start with the Syracuse Nationals. On December 10, 2014, Kerr became the first NBA rookie head coach to win 21 of his first 23 games. He was named the head coach of the Western Conference team for the 2015 NBA All-Star Game after Golden State had the best record in the conference. On April 4, the Warriors beat the Dallas Mavericks 123–110 to clinch home-court advantage throughout the playoffs, and Kerr got his 63rd win of the season to become the highest winning rookie head coach in NBA history, passing Tom Thibodeau and his 62 wins with the Chicago Bulls in the 2010–11 season. In the NBA Coach of the Year voting, Kerr was runner-up to Mike Budenholzer.

The Warriors ultimately finished with one of the best regular seasons in NBA history, and the greatest in the team's 69-year history. Golden State ended with an overall record of 67–15, becoming the 10th team to win 67 or more games in a single season. It was the first time the Warriors had ever won as many as 60 games in a season; their previous high was 59 in the 1975–76 season. The Warriors also ended with a 39–2 home record, which is tied for the second-best home record in NBA history. The Warriors were first in defensive efficiency for the season and second in offensive efficiency, barely missing the mark that the Julius Erving–led Sixers achieved by being first in both offensive and defensive efficiency. They became the first team in NBA history to have two win streaks over 15 at home (18 and 19).

In the opening round of the playoffs against the New Orleans Pelicans, Kerr led the Warriors to their first four-game playoff sweep since the 1975 NBA Finals. Afterwards, the team beat the Memphis Grizzlies (4–2, in the second round). Down 2–1 in the series, Kerr made an unconventional adjustment in Game 4 to leave the Grizzlies' Tony Allen open and have his defender, center Andrew Bogut, guard the interior. His strategy was lauded after Allen, Memphis' best wing defender but a poor jump-shooter, was benched and limited to 16 minutes after missing wide open shots. The Warriors then defeated the Houston Rockets (4–1, in the Western Conference Finals), making the NBA Finals for the first time in 40 years.

The Warriors faced the Cleveland Cavaliers in the Finals. Kerr and rival coach David Blatt were both in their first season as NBA head coaches, and this was the first time a pair of rookie head coaches faced each other in the NBA Finals since the NBA's first year of existence, in 1947 with Eddie Gottlieb of the Philadelphia Warriors and Harold Olsen of the Chicago Stags competing. After the Warriors went down 2–1 to Cleveland, Kerr started swingman Andre Iguodala in place of Bogut, jump-starting their stagnant offense for a 103–82 road win that evened the series. It was Iguodala's first start of the season, and the small unit came to be known as the Death Lineup. After the game, Kerr admitted to lying to the press in response to pregame questions about potential changes to his starting lineup. The Warriors went on to win the championship in six games, defeating the Cavaliers, 4–2, in the series, to give Kerr his sixth championship and first as a head coach.

After the first two days of the defending champion Warriors' training camp, Kerr took an indefinite leave of absence to rehabilitate his back, which had caused problems since the 2015 NBA Finals. Around this time, assistant coach Luke Walton assumed Kerr's coaching duties. Kerr missed all of 2015 and most of January 2016, although technically the NBA credited Walton's win–loss record to Kerr. Kerr said "I think it's ridiculous", when asked about getting all of Walton's wins. On January 22, 2016, Kerr returned to coaching after missing 43 games, but warned he might need to miss games occasionally if there was a recurrence of the headaches and pain related to the spinal fluid leak that sidelined him. The Warriors went 39–4 with interim coach Luke Walton. The Warriors went 34-5 after Kerr returned to coaching. Golden State broke the 1995–96 Chicago Bulls 72–10 record by winning 73 games. Kerr became the first person in NBA history to be a part of 70-win teams as a player and head coach. He was named 2015–16 NBA Coach of the Year. Kerr would lead the Warriors to the 2016 NBA Finals where they would again face the Cleveland Cavaliers. The Warriors lost in seven games.

On November 20, 2016, the NBA announced that Kerr had been fined $25,000 for public criticism of officiating during a radio interview with KNBR 680 on November 17. Kerr missed time during the 2017 playoffs due to recurring back issues. Associate head coach Mike Brown acted as acting head coach during periods of Kerr's absence, and Brown continued head coaching into the playoffs leading the Warriors to a 12–0 record in the postseason. Kerr returned for the 2017 NBA Finals where he led the Warriors to victory over the Cleveland Cavaliers in five games. The Warriors finished the playoffs with a 16–1 record, the best postseason winning percentage in NBA history. Kerr is the fourth coach in NBA history to win two championships in his first three seasons of coaching. Kerr won his third championship as a head coach when the Warriors defeated the Cleveland Cavaliers in the 2018 NBA Finals in four games to give Kerr his eighth championship of his career. The Warriors reached their fifth straight Finals under Kerr in 2019, but they were defeated by the Toronto Raptors in six games. During Game 6, starting shooting guard Klay Thompson suffered an ACL tear.

During the 2019–20 season, with Thompson out for the year and franchise point guard Stephen Curry only playing five games due to a hand injury, the Warriors finished with the worst record (15–50) in the league. It marked the first time in Kerr's coaching career that he had missed the playoffs. In 2020–21, with Thompson still out due to an Achilles tear but Curry healthy, the Warriors qualified for the newly implemented play-in tournament, but ultimately did not qualify for the playoffs for the second straight season. The Warriors returned to the playoffs in 2021–22 and reached the 2022 NBA Finals where they defeated the Boston Celtics. Kerr won his fourth championship as head coach, and his ninth overall.

Legacy 
Kerr has won 429 regular season games and 80 playoff games as head coach. Mainly on the strength of his first three seasons, he has the second-most regular season wins in franchise history behind only Al Attles, while his 80 playoff wins are a franchise record. He is first head coach in NBA history to lead his team to 67 or more wins in three consecutive seasons. He was named to the Top 15 Coaches in NBA History in 2022, when the league commemorated its 75th anniversary.

Personal life 
Kerr married Margot Brennan, his college sweetheart, in 1990. They have three children and 1 adopted child: Wayne, Nick, Maddy, and Matthew. Kerr is a keen soccer fan and an avid supporter of Liverpool F.C.

Political views and activism 
Prior to and following the 2016 United States presidential election, Kerr has been publicly critical of Donald Trump. In an interview following that election, Kerr voiced the opinion that Trump's rise to power was based on insults against women and minorities. He compared Trump's campaign performances and the crude responses of his supporters to the sensationalism of The Jerry Springer Show. He made clear his "disgust" with Trump's disrespectful public discourse and disappointment with Trump's leadership of the country. On October 27, 2020, an ad created by the anti-Trump Republican Lincoln Project Super PAC was first broadcast. In it, along with Philadelphia 76ers coach Doc Rivers, Kerr endorsed Joe Biden for President in the November presidential election. In the advertisement, Kerr said, "I stand for truth over lies", "categorically reject white supremacy", and "believe a presidency should be transparent."
	
Kerr has been a strong supporter of gun control, expressing criticism with the government's response to school shootings. On May 24, 2022, during a press conference for Game 4 of the NBA's 2022 Western Conference Finals after that day's Robb Elementary School shooting in Texas where 19 children and two teachers were murdered by a gunman wielding semi-automatic weapons, Kerr reiterated these points emotionally. He said, regarding the filibuster, that Republicans in the U.S. Senate were "holding us hostage", by using it to prevent a vote on gun control legislation. He would later reiterate these points in January 2023 following the Monterey Park shooting as well as the Half Moon Bay shooting.     

Kerr has voiced support for the Black Lives Matter movements across the United States, praising the efforts of peaceful protests and hopes that more people will take action to stand up to systemic racial injustice to black people.

Career statistics

NBA

Regular season 

|-
| style="text-align:left;"|
| style="text-align:left;"|Phoenix
| 26 || 0 || 6.0 || .435 || .471 || .667 || .7 || .9 || .3 || .0 || 2.1
|-
| style="text-align:left;"|
| style="text-align:left;"|Cleveland
| 78 || 5 || 21.3 || .444 || style="background:#CFECEC;"|.507* || .863 || 1.3 || 3.2 || .6 || .1 || 6.7
|-
| style="text-align:left;"|
| style="text-align:left;"|Cleveland
| 57 || 4 || 15.9 || .444 || .452 || .849 || .6 || 2.3 || .5 || .1 || 4.8
|-
| style="text-align:left;"|
| style="text-align:left;"|Cleveland
| 48 || 20 || 17.6 || .511 || .432 || .833 || 1.6 || 2.3 || .6 || .2 || 6.6
|-
| style="text-align:left;"|
| style="text-align:left;"|Cleveland
| 5 || 0 || 8.2 || .500 || .000 || 1.000 || 1.4 || 2.2 || .4 || .0 || 2.4
|-
| style="text-align:left;"|
| style="text-align:left;"|Orlando
| 47 || 0 || 9.4 || .429 || .250 || .909 || .8 || 1.3 || .2 || .0 || 2.6
|-
| style="text-align:left;"|
| style="text-align:left;"|Chicago
| 82 || 0 || 24.8 || .497 || .419 || .856 || 1.6 || 2.6 || .9 || .0 || 8.6
|-
| style="text-align:left;"|
| style="text-align:left;"|Chicago
| 82 || 0 || 22.4 || .527 || style="background:#CFECEC;"|.524* || .778 || 1.5 || 1.8 || .5 || .0 || 8.2
|-
| style="text-align:left; background:#afe6ba;"|
| style="text-align:left;"|Chicago
| 82 || 0 || 23.4 || .506 || .515 || .929 || 1.3 || 2.3 || .8 || .0 || 8.4
|-
| style="text-align:left; background:#afe6ba;"|
| style="text-align:left;"|Chicago
| 82 || 0 || 22.7 || .533 || .464 || .806 || 1.6 || 2.1 || .8 || .0 || 8.1
|-
| style="text-align:left; background:#afe6ba;"|
| style="text-align:left;"|Chicago
| 50 || 0 || 22.4 || .454 || .438 || .918 || 1.5 || 1.9 || .5 || .1 || 7.5
|-
| style="text-align:left; background:#afe6ba;"|
| style="text-align:left;"|San Antonio
| 44 || 0 || 16.7 || .391 || .313 || .886 || 1.0 || 1.1 || .5 || .1 || 4.4
|-
| style="text-align:left;"|
| style="text-align:left;"|San Antonio
| 32 || 0 || 8.4 || .432 || .516 || .818 || .6 || .4 || .1 || .0 || 2.8
|-
| style="text-align:left;"|
| style="text-align:left;"|San Antonio
| 55 || 1 || 11.8 || .421 || .429 || .933 || .6 || 1.0 || .3 || .0 || 3.3
|-
| style="text-align:left;"|
| style="text-align:left;"|Portland
| 65 || 0 || 11.9 || .470 || .394 || .975 || .9 || 1.0 || .2 || .0 || 4.1
|-
| style="text-align:left; background:#afe6ba;"|
| style="text-align:left;"| San Antonio
| 75 || 0 || 12.7 || .430 || .395 || .882 || .8 || .9 || .4 || .0 || 4.0
|- class="sortbottom"
| style="text-align:center;" colspan="2"|Career
| 910 || 30 || 17.8 || .479 || style="background:#E0CEF2;"|.454 || .864 || 1.2 || 1.8 || .5 || .1 || 6.0

Playoffs 

|-
| style="text-align:left;"|1990
| style="text-align:left;"|Cleveland
| 5 || 0 || 14.6 || .286 || .000 ||  || 1.2 || 2.0 || .8 || .0 || 1.6
|-
| style="text-align:left;"|1992
| style="text-align:left;"|Cleveland
| 12 || 3 || 12.4 || .439 || .273 || 1.000 || .5 || .8 || .4 || .0 || 3.7
|-
| style="text-align:left;"|1994
| style="text-align:left;"|Chicago
| 10 || 0 || 18.6 || .361 || .375 || 1.000 || 1.4 || 1.0 || .7 || .0 || 3.5
|-
| style="text-align:left;"|1995
| style="text-align:left;"|Chicago
| 10 || 0 || 19.3 || .475 || .421 || 1.000 || .6 || 1.5 || .1 || .0 || 5.1
|-
| style="text-align:left; background:#afe6ba;"|1996
| style="text-align:left;"|Chicago
| 18 || 0 || 19.8 || .448 || .321 || .871 || 1.0 || 1.7 || .8 || .0 || 6.1
|-
| style="text-align:left; background:#afe6ba;"|1997
| style="text-align:left;"|Chicago
| 19 || 0 || 17.9 || .429 || .381 || .929 || .9 || 1.1 || .9 || .1 || 5.1
|-
| style="text-align:left; background:#afe6ba;"|1998
| style="text-align:left;"|Chicago
| 21 || 0 || 19.8 || .434 || .463 || .818 || .8 || 1.7 || .3 || .0 || 4.9
|-
| style="text-align:left; background:#afe6ba;"|1999
| style="text-align:left;"|San Antonio
| 11 || 0 || 8.8 || .267 || .231 || .833 || .8 || .7 || .2 || .0 || 2.2
|-
| style="text-align:left;"|2001
| style="text-align:left;"|San Antonio
| 9 || 0 || 11.2 || .480 || .333 || .500 || 1.0 || .7 || .4 || .1 || 3.3
|-
| style="text-align:left;"|2002
| style="text-align:left;"|Portland
| 3 || 0 || 13.0 || .429 || .250 || 1.000 || 1.3 || 1.7 || .3 || .0 || 6.3
|-
| style="text-align:left; background:#afe6ba;"|2003
| style="text-align:left;"|San Antonio
| 10 || 0 || 4.6 || .636 || .833 || .750 || .3 || .6 || .1 || .0 || 2.2
|- class="sortbottom"
| style="text-align:center;" colspan="2"|Career
| 128 || 3 || 15.6 || .426 || .370 || .876 || .9 || 1.2 || .5 || .0 || 4.3

College 

|-
| style="text-align:left;"|1983–84
| style="text-align:left;"|Arizona
| 28 ||  || 22.6 || .516 ||  || .692 || 1.2 || 1.3 || 0.3 || 0.0 || 7.1
|-
| style="text-align:left;"|1984–85
| style="text-align:left;"|Arizona
| 31 ||  || 33.4 || .568 ||  || .803 || 2.4 || 4.0 || 0.6 || 0.1 || 10.0
|-
| style="text-align:left;"|1985–86
| style="text-align:left;"|Arizona
| 32 ||  || 38.4 || .540 ||  || .899 || 3.2 || 4.2 || 1.6 || 0.0 || 14.4
|-
| style="text-align:left;"|1986–87
| style="text-align:left;"|Arizona
| align="center" colspan=11|Redshirted—Did not play
|-
| style="text-align:left;"|1987–88
| style="text-align:left;"|Arizona
| 38 ||  || 32.6 || .559 || .573 || .824 || 2.0 || 3.9 || 1.2 || 0.1 || 12.6
|- class="sortbottom"
| style="text-align:center;" colspan="2"|Career
| 129 ||  || 32.1 || .548 || .573 || .815 || 2.2 || 3.4 || 1.0 || 0.1 || 11.2

Head coaching record 

|- style="background:#fde910;"
| style="text-align:left;"|Golden State
| style="text-align:left;"|
| 82 || 67 || 15 ||  || 1st in Pacific || 21 || 16 || 5 || 
| style="text-align:center;"|Won NBA Championship
|-
| style="text-align:left;"|Golden State
| style="text-align:left;"|
| 82 || style="background:#e0cef2;|73 || 9 || style="background:#e0cef2;| || 1st in Pacific || 24 || 15 || 9 || 
| style="text-align:center;"|Lost in NBA Finals
|- style="background:#fde910;"
| style="text-align:left;"|Golden State
| style="text-align:left;"|
| 82 || 67 || 15 ||  || 1st in Pacific || 17 || 16 || 1 || style="background:#e0cef2;|
| style="text-align:center;"|Won NBA Championship
|- style="background:#fde910;"
| style="text-align:left;"|Golden State
| style="text-align:left;"|
| 82 || 58 || 24 ||  || 1st in Pacific || 21 || 16 || 5 || 
| style="text-align:center;"|Won NBA Championship
|-
| style="text-align:left;"|Golden State
| style="text-align:left;"|
| 82 || 57 || 25 ||  || 1st in Pacific || 22 || 14 || 8 || 
| style="text-align:center;"|Lost in NBA Finals
|-
| style="text-align:left;"|Golden State
| style="text-align:left;"|
| 65 || 15 || 50 ||  || 5th in Pacific || — || — || — || —
| style="text-align:center;"|Missed playoffs
|-
| style="text-align:left;"|Golden State
| style="text-align:left;"|
| 72 || 39 || 33 ||  || 4th in Pacific || — || — || — || —
| style="text-align:center;"|Missed playoffs
|- style="background:#fde910;"
| style="text-align:left;"|Golden State
| style="text-align:left;"|
| 82 || 53 || 29 ||  || 2nd in Pacific || 22 || 16 || 6 || 
| style="text-align:center;"|Won NBA Championship
|- class="sortbottom"
| style="text-align:center;" colspan="2"|Career || 629 || 429 || 200 ||  ||   || 127 || 93 || 34 ||  ||

Awards and honors 
NBA
 Nine-time NBA champion
 Five as a player (1996, 1997, 1998, 1999, 2003)
 Four as a head coach (2015, 2017, 2018, 2022)
 2016 NBA Coach of the Year
 Two-time NBA All-Star Game head coach
 1997 All-Star Weekend Three-Point Contest winner

USA Basketball
 1986 FIBA World Championship (as a player)
 2020 Olympic Gold Medal winner (as an assistant coach)

NCAA
 No. 25 retired by the Arizona Wildcats

Media
Three-time ESPY Award winner
2015 Best Coach/Manager
2017 and 2022 Outstanding Team (as coach of the Warriors)

See also 
 List of NBA players with most championships

Notes

References

External links 

 

1965 births
Living people
1986 FIBA World Championship players
All-American college men's basketball players
American men's basketball coaches
American men's basketball players
Arizona Wildcats men's basketball players
Basketball coaches from California
Basketball players from Los Angeles
Chicago Bulls players
Cleveland Cavaliers players
College basketball announcers in the United States
Competitors at the 1986 Goodwill Games
FIBA World Championship-winning players
Golden State Warriors head coaches
National Basketball Association broadcasters
National Basketball Association championship-winning head coaches
National Basketball Association general managers
Orlando Magic players
Sportspeople from Beirut
Phoenix Suns draft picks
Phoenix Suns executives
Phoenix Suns players
Point guards
Portland Trail Blazers players
San Antonio Spurs players
Shooting guards
United States men's national basketball team players